The 2010–11 WWHL season   consisted of 4 teams: Strathmore Rockies, Edmonton Chimos, Minnesota Whitecaps and a new team Manitoba Maple Leafs. The Calgary Oval X-Treme suspended active participation in the league in 2009-10. They anticipate resuming active participation for the 2011-2012 season.

Regular season Schedule

Final standings
Note: GP = Games played, W = Wins, L = Losses, T = Ties, OTL = Overtime losses, GF = Goals for, GA = Goals against, Pts = Points.

(on March 1, 2011)

Scoring Leaders
(on March 1, 2011)

Goaling Leaders
(on March 1, 2011)

Playoffs
The Clarkson Cup Championship 2011 is scheduled for 24-25-26-27 March. The four competing teams include three from the Canadian Women's Hockey League and the champion team of the Western Women's Hockey League: Minnesota Whitecaps.

Awards and honors

References

External links
   Western Women's Hockey League

Western Women's Hockey League seasons
WWHL
WW